United States of Poland was an unrealized political concept of reborn Poland, created by Ignacy Jan Paderewski (1860–1941). It was first presented in Paderewski Memorial, given to US President Woodrow Wilson on 11 January 1917.

Paderewski's idea postulated rebuilding a Polish state as federation, in which constitution and law would guarantee equality to citizens, ethnic and religious groups. Territory would engulf most of pre-partitioned territory. Taking into account of that time population, the country would have 54 million citizens. On its head would be a President with a title of the King of Poland, Lithuania, Polesia and Halych.

Administrative regions
United States of Poland were to be a number of autonomous states including:
Kingdom of Poland
Kingdom of Lithuania
Kingdom of Polesia
Kingdom of Galicia-Podolia
Kingdom of Volhynia

Later the concept of Galicia-Podolia was supplanted by Kingdom of Halych, in separate memorial there was also postulate of incorporating an Eastern Prussia into it.

Ukrainian problem

The postulate of creation of Kingdoms of Halych and Polesia in the lands  inhabited by large numbers of Ukrainians did not satisfy their interests in creation of an independent state. Paderewski did not pursue the matter due to large percentage of Ukrainian population living in those regions with a different politics and demography.

References

 
Proposed countries
1917 in the United States
Intermarium